Come on Over is a children's television series produced by the Grand Rapids Children's Museum in association with Enthusiastic Productions. The series was created by Joel Schoon Tanis, and is executive produced by Tanis, Patrick W. Ziegler, and Teresa L. Thome of the Museum. The mission of the show is to "inspire creativity and imagination in children".

The program is filmed in the state-of-the-art TV studio of the Martha Miller Center at Hope College in Holland, Michigan. It premiered in Grand Rapids, Michigan on ABC affiliate, WOTV, in fall 2006. Twelve episodes have been produced to date.

The show also features the tunes of Pint Size Music, former members of the Holland band, The Voice, such as Chad Dykema and Paul Chamness. To date, the show has won twelve regional Emmy awards.

It was also broadcast on the Australian Christian Channel in Australia.

Featured actors
 Joel Schoon Tanis as Joel
 Brandy McClendon as Brandy
 Jean Reed Bahle as Grandma Zippy
 Chip Duford as Mr. Flabbinjaw
 Lisa Buckley as Hedge
 Greg Rogers as Random Guy
 Fred Stella as Brandy's Dad
 Edye Evans Hyde as Ms. Lucy
 Michael Ziegler as Laticia 
 Hector the dog

Guest appearances
 Luis Avalos as Beekeeper Luis
 Ruth Buzzi as Beekeeper Ruthie
 Vicki Lewis as Actress Vicki
 Gregory Jbara as Director Greg
 Dana Snyder as Dr. Fulovit
 Fred Willard as Dr. Fred Silliness
 Erik Per Sullivan as Young Luis
 Stephen Mason as Super Cool Guitar Player Steve
 Mindy Sterling as Grandy
 Kara McCoy as Lydia

References

External links
Come on Over!'s official website (as of July 2, 2011, domain name had expired)
 
 Set photos from two episodes featuring "Director Greg"

2000s American children's television series
2006 American television series debuts
American children's education television series
American television shows featuring puppetry
Holland, Michigan